The One Hundred Third Wisconsin Legislature convened from January 10, 2017, to May 8, 2018, in regular session.  The Legislature also held four extraordinary sessions and four special sessions during the legislative term.

Senators representing even-numbered districts were newly elected for this session and were serving the first two years of a four-year term.  Assembly members were elected to a two-year term.  Assembly members and even-numbered senators were elected in the general election held on November 8, 2016.  Senators representing odd-numbered districts were serving the third and fourth year of their four-year term, having been elected in the general election held on November 8, 2014.

Major events 
 January 20, 2017: Inauguration of Donald Trump as 45th President of the United States.
 May 17, 2017: Former FBI Director Robert Mueller was appointed special counsel to investigate Russian interference in the 2016 U.S. presidential election.
 January 20, 2018: U.S. federal government shutdown began, due to dispute over the Deferred Action for Childhood Arrivals program.
 January 22, 2018: U.S. federal government shutdown ended.
 April 3, 2018: Judge Rebecca Dallet was elected to the Wisconsin Supreme Court.
 November 6, 2018: Tony Evers elected Governor of Wisconsin.
 December 22, 2018: U.S. federal government shutdown began, due to dispute over funding for President Donald Trump's planned U.S.–Mexico border wall.

Major legislation

Party summary

Senate

Assembly

Sessions 
 Regular session: January 10, 2017May 8, 2018
 January 2017 Special session: January 5, 2017June 14, 2017
 August 2017 Special session: August 1, 2017September 14, 2017
 January 2018 Special session: January 18, 2018February 27, 2018 
 March 2018 Special session: March 15, 2018March 29, 2018 
 March 2018 Extraordinary session: March 27, 2018March 29, 2018
 April 2018 Extraordinary session: April 4, 2018
 November 2018 Extraordinary session: November 12, 2018January 7, 2019
 December 2018 Extraordinary session: December 3, 2018December 5, 2018

Officers

Senate officers 
 President: Roger Roth (R)
 President pro tempore: Howard Marklein (R)

Senate Majority Leadership 
 Majority Leader: Scott L. Fitzgerald (R)
 Assistant Majority Leader: Leah Vukmir (R)
 Majority Caucus Chair: Sheila Harsdorf (R) (until November 10, 2017)
 After November 10, 2017: Van H. Wanggaard (R)
 Majority Caucus Vice Chair: Van H. Wanggaard (R) (until November 10, 2017)
 After November 10, 2017: Patrick Testin (R)

Senate Minority Leadership 
 Minority Leader: Jennifer Shilling (D)
 Assistant Minority Leader: Janet Bewley (D)
 Minority Caucus Chair: Mark F. Miller (D)
 Minority Caucus Vice Chair: Janis Ringhand (D)

Assembly officers 
 Speaker: Robin Vos (R)
 Speaker pro tempore: Tyler August (R)

Assembly Majority Leadership
 Majority Leader: Jim Steineke (R)
 Assistant Majority Leader: Robert Brooks (R)
 Majority Caucus Chair: Dan Knodl (R)

Assembly Minority Leadership
 Minority Leader: Peter Barca (D) (until September 30, 2017)
 After September 30, 2017: Gordon Hintz (D)
 Assistant Minority Leader: Dianne Hesselbein (D)
 Minority Caucus Chair: Mark Spreitzer (D)

Members

Senate members 
Members of the Wisconsin Senate for the 103rd Wisconsin Legislature:

Assembly members 
Members of the Assembly for the 103rd Wisconsin Legislature:

Employees

Senate employees 
 Chief Clerk: Jeffrey Renk
 Sergeant at Arms: Ted Blazel

Assembly employees 
 Chief Clerk: Patrick Fuller
 Sergeant at Arms: Anne Tonnon Byers

See also 
 2014 Wisconsin elections
 2016 Wisconsin elections
 2016 Wisconsin State Senate election
 2016 Wisconsin State Assembly election

References 

2017 establishments in Wisconsin
Wisconsin
Wisconsin
Wisconsin legislative sessions